Terence Howard (born 26 February 1966) is an English former footballer who played for Chelsea, Crystal Palace, Chester City, Leyton Orient, Wycombe Wanderers, Woking and Aldershot Town.

A tall full-back, Terry Howard played for Essex Schoolboys. He signed for Chelsea as an apprentice in Feb 1983. He was a regular member of the Chelsea Football Combination Championship side in 1984–85. He made his first team debut for Chelsea in April 1985 against Aston Villa.

After loan periods with Crystal Palace and Chester City, he moved to Leyton Orient in 1986.

On 7 February 1995, Howard, in his 397th appearance for Leyton Orient, was sacked at half-time by manager John Sitton, as featured in the Channel 4 documentary Orient: Club for a Fiver.

Honours 
Woking
 FA Trophy: 1996–97

References

External links
Player profile at Post War English & Scottish Football League A - Z Player's Transfer Database

1966 births
Living people
English footballers
Chelsea F.C. players
Crystal Palace F.C. players
Chester City F.C. players
Leyton Orient F.C. players
Wycombe Wanderers F.C. players
Woking F.C. players
Aldershot Town F.C. players
English Football League players
Association football defenders